The 1994 NC State Wolfpack football team represented North Carolina State University during the 1994 NCAA Division I-A football season. The team's head coach was Mike O'Cain.  NC State has been a member of the Atlantic Coast Conference (ACC) since the league's inception in 1953.  The Wolfpack played its home games in 1994 at Carter–Finley Stadium in Raleigh, North Carolina, which has been NC State football's home stadium since 1966.

Schedule

References

NC State
NC State Wolfpack football seasons
Peach Bowl champion seasons
NC State Wolfpack football